Donje Pazarište is a village in Croatia, in the municipality of Gospić, located in central Lika. It is 18 kilometres west of Perušić, and 22 kilometres north-west of Lika's largest town, Gospić.

Etymology 

In the Croatian language, 'Donje' means 'Lower'. It is theorised that the word 'pazarište' originates from the Turkish word 'pazar', most likely from the years of Ottoman Rule, meaning fair, market, or bazaar.

History 

In the 15th Century, the village was known as 'Donje Zažično'.

The village church, the Church of Saint Jacob, was constructed in 1700.

Population 

According to the 2011 census in Croatia, the village has 125 inhabitants.

 1971. - 251 (Croatians - 243, Serbs - 7, Yugoslavs - 1)
 1981. - 174 (Croatian - 172, Serbs - 1, Others - 1)
 1991. - 307 (Croatians - 307)
 2001. - 170
 2011. - 125

Economy 

The village is the home of the producer of Velebitsko beer.

References 

Populated places in Lika-Senj County